Etoile Olympique de La Goulette et du Kram, often referred to as EOGK. is a football club from La Goulette in Tunisia. Founded in 1950, the team plays in green and white colours. The club's current chairman is Mr. Houssam Trabelsi.

The club was relegated from the Ligue Professionnelle 1 to the Ligue Professionnelle 2 in 2006–07 and further relegated to the Ligue Professionnelle 3 in 2007–08.

Football clubs in Tunisia
Association football clubs established in 1950
1950 establishments in Tunisia
Sports clubs in Tunisia